Esther Bendahan Cohen (Tétouan, 1964) is a Moroccan-Spanish writer.

Her Moroccan Jewish family went to Madrid when she was a child, in this city she studied Psychology and French Literature. She is the director of the television program Shalom (RTVE) and the organizer of Centro Sefarad-Israel.

Books
Soñar con Hispania (Dreaming of Hispania) (with Ester Benari), Ediciones Tantín, 2002
La sombra y el mar (Shadow and Sea), Morales del Coso, 2003
Deshojando alcachofas (Putting the Leaves off Some Artichokes), Seix Barral, 2005
Déjalo, ya volveremos (Let It Be, We'll Come Back Some Day), Seix Barral, 2006,  where she tells her childhood and the disintegration of Moroccan Jewish communities.
La cara de Marte (Mars' Face), Algaida, 2007.
El secreto de la reina persa (Persian Queen's Secret), La Esfera de los Libros, 2009
Tratado del alma gemela, Ediciones del Viento, 2012. Award: XXII Premio de Narrativa Gonzalo Torrente Ballester.

Prizes
Premio Fnac, Deshojando alcachofas.
Tigre Juan Award, 2006 with La cara de Marte
Premio Torrente ballester, 2011, El tratado del alma gemela.

Translations
Au nom de l'Autre: Réflexions sur l'antisémitisme qui vient , Alain Finkielkraut, Seix Barral, 2005 (with Adolfo García Ortega).

References

External links
Seix Barral
La Esfera de los Libros 
Déjalo, ya volveremos, Chapter 1 (PDF)
http://elpais.com/elpais/2013/11/20/opinion/1384972577_665223.html

1964 births
21st-century Moroccan women writers
Living people
People from Tétouan
Jewish women writers
Moroccan emigrants to Spain
20th-century Moroccan Jews
21st-century Spanish women writers